WHSmith (also written WH Smith, and known colloquially as Smith's and formerly as W. H. Smith & Son) is a British retailer, with headquarters in Swindon, England, which operates a chain of high street, railway station, airport, port, hospital and motorway service station shops selling books, stationery, magazines, newspapers, entertainment products and confectionery. 

The company was formed by Henry Walton Smith and his wife Anna in 1792 as a news vendor in London. It remained under the ownership of the Smith family for many years and saw large-scale expansion during the 1970s as the company began to diversify into other markets. Following a rejected private equity takeover in 2004, the company began to focus on its core retail business. It was responsible for the creation of the ISBN book identifier.

WHSmith is listed on the London Stock Exchange and is a constituent of the FTSE 250 Index.

History

Formation

In 1792, Henry Walton Smith and his wife Anna established the business as a news vendor in Little Grosvenor Street, London. After their deaths, the business — valued in 1812 at £1,280 — was taken over by their youngest son William Henry Smith, and in 1846 the firm became W. H. Smith & Son when his only son, also named William Henry, became a partner. The firm took advantage of the railway boom by opening news-stands on railway stations, beginning with Euston in 1848. In 1850, the firm opened depots in Birmingham, Manchester and Liverpool. It also ran a circulating library service, from 1860 to 1961, and a publishing business based at the Steam Press, Cirencester. The younger W. H. Smith used the success of the firm as a springboard into politics, becoming a Member of Parliament (MP) in 1868 and serving as a minister in several Conservative governments.

After the death of W. H. Smith the younger in 1891, his widow was created Viscountess Hambleden in her own right; their son inherited the business from his father and the viscountcy from his mother. After the death of the second Viscount in 1928, the business was reconstituted as a limited company, in which his son, the third Viscount, owned all the ordinary shares. On the death of the third Viscount in 1948, the death duties were so large that a public holding company had to be formed and shares sold to WH Smith staff and the public. A younger brother of the third Viscount remained chairman until 1972, but the Smith family's control slipped away, and the last family member left the board in 1996.

In 1966, WHSmith originated a nine-digit code for uniquely referencing books, called Standard Book Numbering or SBN. It was adopted as international standard ISO 2108 in 1970, and was used until 1974, when it became the ISBN scheme.

Expansion
From the 1970s, WHSmith began to expand into other retail sectors. WH Smith Travel operated from 1973 to 1991. The Do It All chain of DIY shops originated with an acquisition in 1979, becoming a joint venture with Boots in 1990; Boots acquired WHSmith's share in June 1996. The bookshop chain Waterstone's, founded by former WHSmith executive Tim Waterstone in 1982, was bought in 1989 and sold in 1998.

The expanding WHSmith group adopted a new "house style" or corporate identity in 1973, with a new logo and a change of name from W. H. Smith & Son to WHSmith. The new hexagon-shaped logo featured the initials of the group on the sides of a box employing a new orange and brown colour scheme, replacing a logo that had been in use since before 1830. This updated visual identity extended throughout the company's operations, specified by a design manual, covering everything from the appropriate use of the logo in retail environments, through the design of decorative elements on wrapping paper and promotional material, the layout of stationery, labels and forms, and even crockery, also informing the design of staff uniforms and packaging.

In 1986, WHSmith bought a 75% controlling share of the Our Price music retail chain; in the 1990s it also bought other music retailers including the Virgin Group's smaller (non-Megastore) shops. The 75% share of Virgin Our Price was sold to Virgin Retail Group Ltd in July 1998 for £145m. WHSmith also owned the American record chain The Wall, which was sold to Camelot Music in 1998.

In March 1998, the company acquired John Menzies' retail outlets for £68m, which for many years had been the main rival to the company's railway-station outlets. This purchase also cleared the way for WHSmith's retail expansion into Scotland. Prior to the takeover, Menzies' larger Scottish shops (carrying a very similar range of products to High Street WHSmith shops elsewhere) dominated the market, and the latter's presence was minimal.

Restructuring
For several years, the company's retail arm had difficulties competing with specialist book and music chains on one side and large supermarkets on the other. This led to poor financial performance, and a takeover bid in 2004 by Permira, which fell through. The company reacted to this by disposing of its overseas subsidiaries and its publishing business Hodder Headline, in order to concentrate on reforming its core businesses.

In August 2006, the company demerged the retail and news distribution arms of the business into two separate companies: WH Smith plc (retail) and Smiths News plc (newspaper and magazine distribution). In September 2010 WHSmith bought The Gadget Shop from The Entertainer. That year, it also bought online greeting card retailer Funky Pigeon.

Since 2011

In April 2011, WHSmith agreed a deal with the legal services provider QualitySolicitors under which QualitySolicitors would place representatives in up to 500 of its UK branches. Past Times went into administration in January 2012, and the brand name was bought by WHSmith in March 2013.

In October 2013, WHSmith announced that it had bought the ModelZone brand and would sell products under this brand through existing WHSmith shops. In October 2014, WHSmith announced as part of its preliminary statement that it was planning on extending its greetings card offering by launching the low-price brand Cardmarket on a trial basis. According to the statement, these trial shops would be in low rent areas and let to WHSmith under short-term leases. The company announced in late 2018 that the trial of Cardmarket would be wound up, with the closure of the Cardmarket stores. This was in addition to the announcement of the closure for at least six WHSmith stores which were deemed economically unviable following a strategic business review.

Late in 2017, the company purchased Cult Pens, a UK-based online retailer of specialist pens, for an undisclosed amount.

In 2018, WHSmith acquired the brand InMotion, the largest airport-based electronics retailer in the USA. InMotion expanded to operate stores within UK airports including Heathrow, Manchester and Birmingham, as well as internationally in Spain and Australia.

In July 2020, WHSmith announced more than 150 redundancies at its head office, representing approximately 18% of the head office workforce. In November 2020, the company announced that, after a loss of £280 million, it had decided to close 25 stores in the country, noting that eight stores had been closed in 2019.

In August 2020, WHSmith launched a new flagship store in Terminal 2 at Heathrow Airport, in collaboration with Well, which features an in-house pharmacy.

Television
WHSmith founded one of the UK's earliest cable television channels, Lifestyle, which was carried on almost every cable system in the UK and Ireland prior to the start of Sky Television in 1989. By late 1984, the company had bought a 15% stake in Screensport and from January 1986, took over the operations and management when ABC and R Kennedy pulled out. Both channels were closed in 1993.

Operations

United Kingdom

Since 2007, the company has taken on a number of Post Office branches, mainly within its high street shops. By April 2016, this had reached 107, including former Crown Post Offices, with plans for an additional 61.

WHSmith also operate a number of shops within hospitals, following its acquisition of Yorkshire-based newsagent chain United News in March 2008.

In addition to its existing joint ventures and franchise shops, the company trialed the smaller format, convenience-based WHSmith Local concept during 2013. Targeted at independent newsagents and post office business owners, a total of 40 such stores were trading and a further 40 planned by the time the 2015 annual report had been published.

Since 2011, the company has also opened shops using its Funky Pigeon brand and subsidiary Funky Pigeon.com Ltd which offers stationery and personalised greetings cards both online and via stores.

International

Canadian operations began in 1950. By 1970, there were 14 stores in Canada. They continued until 1989, when they were sold to domestic owners and renamed SmithBooks. SmithBooks later merged with Coles, forming Chapters, which retained the Coles and SmithBooks names and locations while also opening new namesake superstores. Many SmithBooks locations were eventually closed or converted to Coles; a few locations still retain the name as of 2013.

By 1970, WHSmith had one retail store in both Brussels and Paris. The company retains one shop on Rue de Rivoli in the centre of Paris, France.

WHSmith operated shops in the United States from 1985 until 2003, primarily in airports. The company acquired Australian and New Zealand subsidiaries in 2001, which were subsequently disposed of, along with those in Hong Kong International Airport (now as Page One) and in Singapore at Changi Airport, in 2004 (now Times Travel under the Times Bookstore banner).

WHSmith restarted its Australian operations in March 2011 following the collapse of Angus & Robertson/Borders who held the naming rights in Australia. The first new shop was opened at Melbourne Airport, in the international departures terminal.  There are now three outlets at Melbourne Airport, three at Southern Cross railway station and one within Melbourne Central.

WHSmith has opened shops in major Indian airports. WHSmith is currently in the process of planning 30 kiosk shops in China. Currently, WHSmith sponsor the IPL cricket team (Sunrisers Hyderabad) (SRH) in India.

In October 2008, WHSmith, together with SSP, opened five branches within Copenhagen Airport, and in April 2009, opened a branch in Stockholm-Arlanda Airport. In 2009, WHSmith opened two shops in Shannon Airport, County Clare, Ireland. A further three shops are operated in Dublin Airport's Terminal Two, which opened in November 2010 and 5 shops in Dublin Airport's Terminal One, which opened in 2013. The chain promised when winning this latter contract to hire a full-time Irish book buyer; however, the appointment of an Australian, based in London and not in Dublin, drew adverse criticism.

In 2013, it opened an additional four shops at Dublin Airport's Terminal 1. Eason's, currently at T1 in Dublin, asked the airport operator to tender for a new contract one year earlier as the retailer blamed a fall in sales on the success of Terminal 2 at Dublin, which carried the majority of long haul traffic and long haul passengers tend to spend more on books.

WHSmith opened four branches in Helsinki Airport, Finland in late 2016 and early 2017.

The company has a shop in Malta International Airport which was opened in 2016 under a franchise agreement with Miller Distributors.

Controversies
On 19 June 2009, WHSmith apologised after promoting a book on cellar rapist Josef Fritzl as one of the "Top 50 Books for Dad" as a Father's Day gift.

In October 2012, WHSmith faced criticism from shooters after the sale of shooting magazines to children under 14 was banned, although it is legal for children under 14 to go shooting. The decision appeared to follow a campaign by animal rights activists. The British Association for Shooting and Conservation (BASC) campaigned against the ban, including a 12,000+ signature petition. In mid-November it emerged that the restrictions had been removed from all UK shooting magazines.

On 14 October 2013, WHSmith took their website offline because "unacceptable titles were appearing on their website". These were e-books with themes of abuse.

The chain was criticised in 2014 for the condition of its shops, with both analysts and customers accusing the chain of under-investing in its estate.

In 2015, an investigation by The Independent revealed that WHSmith and other airport retailers were charging VAT to shoppers travelling outside the European Union, then claiming the VAT back from the government and not passing the refund on to customers. This was made possible by the practice of scanning customer's boarding passes at the till point – solely for the benefit of the company – which made the passengers unwitting accomplices in their own deception. After a public outcry, a customer revolt in which many refused to hand over their boarding passes, and an intervention by Parliament, the company confirmed in March 2017 that it would pass on the VAT reduction to customers spending over £6, who were travelling outside the EU.

In 2015, the company was also criticised for the prices charged in its branches in hospitals, after media investigations found some items to be on sale at significantly higher prices than in high street branches. In May 2018, WHSmith apologised after it was revealed that it had made more than £700 by selling single tubes of toothpaste for £7.99 through its branch in Pinderfields Hospital, Wakefield. The price was described as an 'error' and WHSmith promised that the proceeds from the sales would be donated to a local charity. The price was restored to £2.49, still more than three times the price of 80p charged in a nearby Tesco.

See also

 Retail Book Association
 Books in the United Kingdom

Notes

References

External links
 Corporate website
 Retail website

British brands
Companies listed on the London Stock Exchange
Retail companies of the United Kingdom
Retail companies established in 1792
Companies based in Swindon
Bookshops of the United Kingdom
Book selling websites
1792 establishments in England